Prebilovci is a village in Bosnia and Herzegovina, near the city of Čapljina (Чапљина). Prebilovci was first mentioned in the 15th century. The village has a population of roughly around 50 inhabitants.

Prebilovci is located in the Čapljina municipality, which makes up one of the nine municipalities in the Herzegovina-Neretva Canton. The village is also located near the Nature Park and Bird Reserve of Hutovo Blato (5 km from Čapljina). Since 1995, Hutovo Blato has been protected as a nature park by the Public Enterprise Hutovo Blato.

Population

Ethnic composition, 1991 census
total: 174
 Serbs - 171 (98.27%)
 Croats - 1 (0.57%)
 others and unknown - 2 (1.14%)
 Official results from the book: Ethnic composition of Bosnia-Herzegovina population, by municipalities and settlements, 1991. census, Zavod za statistiku Bosne i Hercegovine - Bilten no.234, Sarajevo 1991.

According to the 2013 census, its population was 57, all Serbs.

History
The name of the village, Prebilovci, first emerged sometime around the 15th century, and is believed to have come from the old family of Pribilović. In the Serb Orthodox cemetery and in some other locations too, there are many beautifully carved out stone graves, probably of bogomils from the Middle Ages. There is also an old grave which is believed to have belonged to a certain Stjepan Pribilović. Today the name Pribilovci is also more frequently used for the village.

Before the outbreak of the Second World War In Yugoslavia, the village was made up of Serbs and a few Bosniak families as well. The present population is primary made up of Serbs, ever since the war drew to a close, when the Bosniaks left their homes or were expelled because of the ethnic tensions. The people acted in revenges for atrocities committed against their women and children. Few villages in Herzegovina have witnessed these kinds of horrors during the world war two persecution and genocide of Serbs.

World War II

Prebilovci Massacre
During the Second World War, on 6 August 1941, some 650 women and children were taken away from their homes, after which they were moved to a place called Šurmanci, where they were later thrown into natural pits around that area (the most infamous being Golubinka), together with 1,300 other Serbs living in the Čapljina and Mostar municipalities.

References

External links
 Prebilovci Site I - 
 Prebilovci Site II - 

Villages in the Federation of Bosnia and Herzegovina
Populated places in Čapljina
Serb communities in the Federation of Bosnia and Herzegovina